Genickschussanlage (German for "neck shooting facility") is the official name of a facility used for surprise executions in Nazi Germany. The victim was placed, under the pretext of a medical examination, in a position where a shot could be fired into the back of their neck from the neighbouring room. For that purpose, the facilities were partly disguised as height measuring devices or medicinal instruments. The facilities are mostly known from concentration camps, where they were not only used to carry out official death sentences but also to carry out inconspicuous murder of larger groups of victims.

In the Buchenwald concentration camp 
In the Buchenwald concentration camp, after 1941, the facility was mostly used to execute Soviet prisoners of war. These prisoners, who were brought to the camp from other concentration camps, were placed in a former horse stable converted to a rudimentary medical examination room under the pretext of a medical examination. Soviet prisoners of war were then placed in front of the measuring device on the wall; and, during the "measuring", they were executed by shooting them in the back of the neck through a specially created hole in the wall. The floor was colored in brown to conceal the blood to new prisoners.

Because the prisoners were brought for immediate execution, neither their arrival at the camp nor their death were registered in the camp's listings. The number of victims shot with the help of this device is estimated to be about 8,000.

The  was responsible for the device.

References 

Execution methods
Holocaust terminology
Infrastructure of the Holocaust